The English Schools' Athletics Championships are annual national athletics competitions organised by the English Schools' Athletic Association ESAA for students in England aged 12–18 for track and field, cross country and race walking.

The events are used to select the English team for the Schools International Athletics Board competitions (which involve England, Scotland, Wales, and Northern Ireland) and the ISF World Schools' Cross Country Championships and World Schools Track & Field Championships.

Age groups 
Age groups for the championships are defined based on a student's age on 31 August of the school year in which the competition is held as follows:

Track and field championships 
The track and field championships have been held every year since 1925 (except for 1940–1945 due to World War II), are the 4th largest athletics event in the world and since 2003 have been held at the major athletics venues of Birmingham Alexander Stadium, Gateshead International Stadium and former Sheffield Don Valley Stadium.

To be eligible to compete students must attain an entry standard. Each county selects a team for the championships from the eligible students attending schools in their area subject to various constraints including maximum team sizes and students only being allowed to participate in a single individual event at the championships. Teams earn points based on the finishing position of their students in each event and their performances levels. The teams compete for various trophies based on their points earned. Since 1951 Essex have attained the overall highest points total the most times.

Cross country championships 
The cross country championships have been held every year since 1960 for boys and 1968 for girls (except for 2001 due to the foot-and-mouth outbreak). Originally separate events were held for boys and girls but since 1989 they have always been combined.

Combined events and race walking championships 
A separate championships is held each year for combined events and race walking. For combined events students compete in the track and field pentathlon (JB, JG), heptathlon (IG, SG), octathlon (IB) and decathlon (SB) events. For race walking students compete over 3000 metres (JB, JG, IG) and 5000 metres (IB, SB, SG).

Notable competitors 
Many competitors at the English Schools' Athletics Championships have gone on to win individual Olympic and World Championship medals including multiple gold medallists Mo Farah, Jessica Ennis-Hill, Kelly Holmes and Greg Rutherford.

External links 
 English Schools' Athletic Association (ESAA)

References 

Athletics competitions in England
1925 establishments in England
Education in England
Recurring sporting events established in 1925
School sport in the United Kingdom
Under-18 athletics competitions
Youth sport in England